Galachipa is an upazila of Patuakhali District in the Division of Barisal, Bangladesh. In March 2011, part of the upazila was separated to make the new Rangabali Upazila.

Geography
It has 49,982 households and a total area of 1267.89 km2.

Rivers
Galachipa Upazila has many rivers and canals. The Bay of Bengal is very close here. However, Galachipa is situated on the bank of the Ramnabad in Patuakhali District. Due to the river Galachipa is a famous port for rice and other crops. A large Haat takes place every Saturday based on the river. It is one of the largest Haats of greater Barisal. Another famous rivers of Galachipa are Agunmukha, Bura Gaurang.

Charanchal
Galachipa Upzilla is famous for her "Charanchal". "Char" means land disconnected from the mainland by rivers. These lands are highly disconnected and the river route is the only route. Road traffic has not been arranged yet. Some chars are larger while some are very much smaller. Rangabali, Baher Char, Barho Baishdia, Choto Baishdia, Chalitabunia, Char Kajal, Char Shiba, Char Montaj, Char Biswas, Mayar Char, Char Karfarma, Char Lakshmi, Char Kukrhi Mukrhi, Latar Char, Char Kalagachia, etc. are very known to all.
The land of these chars are very fertile and crops grow heavily here. But most of the people here are poor and deprived. They also suffer from lack of information greatly and their style of life is very low. The people here are mainly "Bhumiheen" (landless).

Demographics
As of 1991 Bangladesh census, Galachipa has a population of 286,307. Males constitute 51.36% of the population, and females 48.64%. This Upazila's adult population is 137,818. Galachipa has an average literacy rate of 29.4% (7+ years), and the national average of 32.4% literate.

Points of interest
Agunmukha river is situated at side of Panpatty Union. It is the meet-point of several rivers. There is a sluice-gate of 15 doors as like Kaptai Dam in Rangamati at Panpatty border. Bakulbaria Plant Product Center by Nesar Matubbar

Administration
Galachipa Upazila is divided into Galachipa Municipality and 12 union parishads: Amkhola, Bakulbaria, Char Biswas, Char Kajol, Chiknikandi, Dakua, Galachipa, Gazalia, Golkhali, Kalagachhia, Panpatty, and Ratandi Taltali. The union parishads are subdivided into 140 mauzas and 227 villages.

Galachipa Municipality is subdivided into 9 wards and 9 mahallas.

Education
Galachipa Upazila has a number of schools, madrashas and colleges.
 Galachipa Govt. Model Secondary School
 Galachipa Govt. Degree College
 Galachipa Girls' Secondary School
 Galachipa Women Degree College
 Galachipa NZMA Alim Madrasha
 Galachipa Ideal School & College
 Udayan Pre-Cadet and Secondary School
 Galachipa High School attached Primary School
 Galachipa Girls High School attached Primary School
 Patabunia High School
 Patabunia Ideal Agricultural and Technical School
 Lamna Polytechnic Institute
 Uttor Purba Gazalia Dakhil Madrasha
 Ulania Hat High School
 Panpatty High School
 Bango Bondhu Girls High School
 Haridevpur High School
 Haridebpur Secondary School
 Charkhali Secondary School
 North Chair Khali High School
 Char Kazal High school
 Char Kapal Bera Adarsha Secondary School
 Chickni kandi High school
Shuhari High School
 Chicknikandi High School & College 
 Chicknikandi Salehia Dakhil Madrasha 
 Chicknikandi Primary School
 Kharizzama Ishak Secondary School
 Kharizzama Degree College

Media
 ভয়েস অফ গলাচিপা
 Galachipa.com
 নবজাগরণ ইয়ুথ ফাউন্ডেশন
 গলাচিপা বার্তা

Notable residents
 Habibur Rahman Mia, First MP in Independent Bangladesh in 1973 Bangladeshi general election
 Moazzem Hossain, Second MP in Independent Bangladesh in 1979 General Election
 Anwar Hossain Howlader, MP in 1986 Bangladeshi general election
 AKM Jahangir Hossain, the member of parliament (MP) for constituency Patuakhali-3 from 1991 to 2006, has been MP for Patuakhal-3 again since 2014.
 Golam Maula Rony was the member of parliament for constituency Patuakhali-3 from 2009 to 2014.
 S M Shahjada Saju was the member of parliament for constituency Patuakhali-3 from 2018 to 2023.
 Nurul Haq Nur, joint-convener of Bangladesh Sadharan Chhatra Adhikar Sangrakshan Parishad and former vice-president, Dhaka University Central Students' Union
 Abul Hossain, former director general of Border Guards Bangladesh. He was also ex-officio chairman of Shimanto Bank which is a sister concern of BGB Welfare Trust.
 Huzzatul Islam, Engineer, Journalist, Founder "Nobojagoron Youth Foundation"

See also
 Upazilas of Bangladesh
 Districts of Bangladesh
 Divisions of Bangladesh

References

External links

 
Upazilas of Patuakhali District